Phreatobacter cathodiphilus is a Gram-negative, aerobic, non-spore-forming and motile bacterium from the genus of Phreatobacter.

References 

Hyphomicrobiales
Bacteria described in 2018